2,4,6-Tribromoaniline is a chemical compound with a formula of  C6H4Br3N. It is used in organic synthesis of pharmaceuticals, agrochemicals and fire-extinguishing agents.

Synthesis 
2,4,6-Tribromoaniline can be prepared by treating bromine water with aniline in a solution of acetic acid or dilute hydrochloric acid:

See also 
 Bromine test
 4-Bromoaniline
 2,4,6-Tribromoanisole
 2,4,6-Tribromophenol

References 

Anilines
Bromoarenes